Free Spirits is an album by pianist and composer Mary Lou Williams recorded in 1975 and released on the SteepleChase label in 1976.

Reception

Allmusic said it "Includes great trio cuts". The Penguin Guide to Jazz selected this album as part of its suggested Core Collection.

Track listing
 "Dat Dere" (Bobby Timmons) – 4:48
 "Baby Man, #2" (John Stubblefield) – 7:56 Bonus track on CD reissue 		
 "Baby Man" (Stubblefield) – 8:31
 "All Blues" (Miles Davis) – 6:59
 "Temptation" (Nacio Herb Brown, Arthur Freed) – 5:08
 "Pale Blue" (Buster Williams) – 4:27
 "Free Spirits #2" (Stubblefield) – 5:04 Bonus track on CD reissue 
 "Free Spirits" (Stubblefield) – 5:25
 "Blues for Timme" (Mary Lou Williams) – 5:37
 "Ode to Saint Cecile" (Mary Lou Williams) – 5:55 Bonus track on CD reissue 
 "Surrey with the Fringe on Top" (Richard Rodgers, Oscar Hammerstein II) – 2:58 Bonus track on CD reissue 
 "Gloria" (Mary Lou Williams) – 5:31

Personnel
Mary Lou Williams – piano
Buster Williams – bass
Mickey Roker – drums

References

1975 albums
Mary Lou Williams albums
SteepleChase Records albums